Neetu Kapoor (née Singh; born Harneet Kaur), is an Indian actress who is known for appearing in Hindi films throughout the late 1960s, 1970s and early 1980s. In 2012, Singh was inducted into the Walk of the Stars, an entertainment hall of fame at Bandra bandstand in Mumbai.

Singh made her debut in the swashbuckler film Suraj (1966) and thereafter played a dual role in the romantic comedy Do Kaliyaan (1968). She began her transition to mature roles with the vigilante film Rickshawala (1973) and had her breakthrough with Nasir Hussain's masala film Yaadon Ki Baaraat (1973), where she appeared as a dancer. She rose to prominence with roles in the crime drama film Deewaar (1975), the thriller film Khel Khel Mein (1975), the musical film Kabhi Kabhie (1976), the masala film Amar Akbar Anthony (1977) and the fantasy film Dharam Veer (1977). Her performances in the crime drama film Parvarish (1977), the horror film Jaani Dushman (1979), the disaster film Kaala Patthar (1979) and the musical film Yaarana (1981) were praised, and for Kaala Patthar, she was nominated for the Filmfare Award for Best Supporting Actress. 

In 1980, she married actor Rishi Kapoor, with whom she had two children, including the actor Ranbir Kapoor. She went on a hiatus after appearing in the thriller film Ganga Meri Maa (1983). Nearly three decades later, she made her acting comeback with a minor role Love Aaj Kal (2009). She has since led the comedy film Do Dooni Chaar (2010) which won her a Zee Cine Award, the action film Besharam (2013), and made a guest appearance in the romantic drama Jab Tak Hai Jaan (2012) and starred in the film Jugjugg Jeeyo (2022).

Early life 
Singh was born as Harneet Kaur in New Delhi to Punjabi Sikh parents, Darshan Singh and Rajee Kaur Singh. She began acting as a child artist shortly after her father's death.

Career
Singh entered films as an uncredited child artist in Suraj (1966) starring Vyjayanthimala and Rajendra Kumar. This was followed by appearances in other top-grossing films like Dus Lakh (1966), Do Kaliyaan (1968), and Waris (1969). She was particularly appreciated for playing the double role of twin sisters in Do Kaliyaan. In most of these films, she was credited as Baby Sonia. 

In 1973, she played her first lead role in Rickshawala opposite Randhir Kapoor. The film was a remake of the Tamil film Rickshawkaran (1971), but failed to match the success of this film. Later that year, however, Singh garnered mainstream attention for her appearance in a popular song “Lekar Hum Deewana Dil” from Nasir Hussain’s blockbuster film Yaadon Ki Baaraat (1973).

The romantic films Rafoo Chakkar (1975) and Khel Khel Mein (1975) established her and Rishi Kapoor as a popular on-screen pair, and they were subsequently cast in several more films together. Khel Khel Mein in particular was propelled by the success of R.D. Burman’s soundtrack. She gained further commercial success in Shankar Dada (1976) opposite Shashi Kapoor and Maha Chor (1976) opposite Rajesh Khanna.

Her two most prominent films in this time period were Deewaar (1975) and Kabhi Kabhie (1976), both ensemble films directed by leading filmmaker Yash Chopra. In the action drama Deewaar, she played the vivacious love interest to Shashi Kapoor. The ensemble musical romantic drama Kabhi Kabhie, which featured her as an adoptee determined to find her birth mother, was one of the most acclaimed films of that time and continues to be remembered today for its soundtrack by Khayyam and Sahir Ludhianvi. 

Singh’s most successful release of 1977 was Amar Akbar Anthony, directed by veteran filmmaker Manmohan Desai, in which she played a young doctor in love with a singer played by Rishi Kapoor. In the same year, Desai also cast her in the adventure film Dharam Veer opposite Jeetendra and the crime drama Parvarish opposite Amitabh Bachchan. All three of these films ranked among the top five highest-grossing films of the year, with Amar Akbar Anthony taking the top spot. 

For the next few years, Singh achieved success as the solo female lead in films like Priyatama (1977), Maha Badmaash (1977), Dhongee (1979), and Chorni (1982). She was also featured in a number of popular ensemble films like Adalat (1977), Kasme Vaade (1978), Jaani Dushman (1979), Kaala Patthar (1979), The Burning Train (1980), Yaarana (1981), and Teesri Aankh (1982). In these films, her most successful associations were with actors like Jeetendra, Amitabh Bachchan, and Randhir Kapoor. For Yash Chopra's Kaala Patthar, she earned her first Filmfare Award nomination. 

After her marriage in 1980, she retired from acting. Her last film to be released was Ganga Meri Maa (1983). 25 years later, Singh was seen in a cameo appearance in Imtiaz Ali’s Love Aaj Kal (2009). 

Singh's first lead role post-retirement was that of a middle-class Punjabi mother in Habib Faisal’s Do Dooni Chaar (2010), which won the National Film Award for Best Feature Film in Hindi. She then made a special appearance in Yash Chopra’s final film Jab Tak Hai Jaan (2012), and also co-starred with her son Ranbir Kapoor in the unsuccessful comedy Besharam (2013). In all four of these films, she was paired opposite her husband Rishi Kapoor. After 9 years, she ended her hiatus by starring opposite Anil Kapoor in Jug Jugg Jeeyo , also starring Varun Dhawan, Kiara Advani and Prajakta Koli.

Personal life

During production of the film Kabhie Kabhie, Singh and actor Rishi Kapoor became romantically involved off-screen. The pair married on 22 January 1980. The couple have two children, Riddhima Kapoor Sahni (born 15 September 1980) and Ranbir Kapoor (born 28 September 1982). Riddhima is a fashion designer who married Delhi-based industrialist Bharat Sahni on 25 January 2006. Through Riddhima, they have a granddaughter, Samara Sahni (born 23 March 2011). Ranbir is an Indian actor who married actress Alia Bhatt on 14 April 2022. Through Ranbir, they have a granddaughter, Raha Kapoor (born 6 November 2022).

Following a recurring battle with leukemia and treatment in New York City, Rishi Kapoor died on 30 April 2020. During the filming of Jug Jugg Jeeyo, she tested positive for COVID-19 in Chandigarh in December 2020. However, she recovered after an isolation period, returning to the film's sets in early January 2021.

Filmography

Films

Television

Accolades

Other awards and honours 
Singh was inducted into the Walk of the Stars, an entertainment hall of fame at Bandra bandstand in Mumbai, where her hand print was preserved for posterity under her married name Neetu Kapoor.

References

External links

 
 

Living people
Indian film actresses
Actresses in Hindi cinema
Actresses from Delhi
Indian child actresses
Year of birth missing (living people)
Kapoor family
20th-century Indian actresses
21st-century Indian actresses
Hill Grange High School alumni